Samuel Fricker (born 4 May 2002) is an Australian diver. He competed in the 2020 Summer Olympics. Fricker grew up in Newcastle and now lives in Cronulla. Fricker has used his social media following to produce content and support various charities.

Biography
Fricker enrolled in his first diving competition at age 10. Prior to that he had competed in gymnastics and athletics.

At the age of 12, Fricker won the 1m springboard, the 5m Platform and the 3m Synchronised Springboard dives at the 2015 National Age Diving Championships. He became Diver of the Year in the 12–13 years category.

Fricker went to Trinity Grammar School in Sydney where he was trained in diving.

Since competing in the Tokyo 2020 Olympics, Fricker has amassed a large following on the social media platform TikTok, with over 1.2 million followers.

He currently runs a company that makes biodegradable wheat straws.

On 19 August 2021, Fricker became the second guest to join sports journalism brand and business Featuring Faulks.

Fricker competed at the 2022 Commonwealth Games where he won a bronze medal in the men’s 3m springboard event alongside Li Shixin and came 10th in the Men's 3 metre springboard event.

On 29 November 2022, Fricker was awarded the Australian Sports Medal by the Governor of New South Wales.

Charity work 
Fricker worked with the Starlight Children's Foundation in their Super Swim Challenge, held in February 2022.

International competitions

References

External links
 

2002 births
Living people
Australian male divers
Olympic divers of Australia
Divers at the 2020 Summer Olympics
Divers at the 2022 Commonwealth Games
Commonwealth Games medallists in diving
Commonwealth Games bronze medallists for Australia
21st-century Australian people
Sportsmen from New South Wales
Recipients of the Australian Sports Medal
Medallists at the 2022 Commonwealth Games